Bruce Charles Eastick,  (born 25 October 1927) is a former South Australian politician, and was South Australian Leader of the Opposition from 1972 to 1975. He was a member of the Liberal and Country League (LCL), later renamed the South Australian Division of the Liberal Party of Australia in 1974. He represented the South Australian House of Assembly seat of Light from 1970 to 1993.

Gawler Council
Eastick was a member of the Gawler Council from 1963 to 1972, and served as mayor from 1968 to 1972. He had a second stint as mayor from 1993 to 2000.

Parliament
Eastick was elected to the House of Assembly for Light, based on Gawler, in 1970. Two years later, after Steele Hall resigned as LCL leader, the party elected Eastick as his successor.

Eastick led his party to the 1973 and 1975 elections, losing both to the Don Dunstan-led South Australian Branch of the Australian Labor Party. His term as leader saw the LCL, the state's main conservative party since 1932, formally rename itself as the South Australian Division of the Liberal Party of Australia, although a separate state Country Party had been reformed in 1963. He was thus the only LCL leader to have never served as Premier.

Eastick also served as Speaker of the South Australian House of Assembly when his successor as South Australia Liberal leader, David Tonkin, was Premier from 1979 to 1982.

Honours
In 1996, Eastick was made a Member of the Order of Australia (AM), in recognition of his "service to the South Australian Parliament, local government and the community".

Eastick is the eldest son of Sir Thomas Charles ("Tom") Eastick.

References

External links

 

1927 births
Leaders of the Opposition in South Australia
Liberal and Country League politicians
Liberal Party of Australia members of the Parliament of South Australia
Living people
Members of the Order of Australia
Speakers of the South Australian House of Assembly